Tall commonly refers to:
Tall, a degree of height
Tall, a degree of human height

Tall may also refer to:

Places
 Tall, Semnan, a village in Semnan Province of Iran
 River Tall, a river in Northern Ireland, United Kingdom

Arts. entertainment, and media
 Tall: The American Skyscraper and Louis Sullivan, a 2006 documentary film
 Mr. Tall, a fictional character in the Mr. Men series

Other uses
 Tall (surname), a surname
 Tall tale, a lie or fictitious story
Tell (archaeology), or tall, a type of archaeological site

See also
 List of people known as the Tall
 TAL (disambiguation)
 Tell (disambiguation)

ar:طويل